Aemilian may refer to:
 Aemilianus (207–253), emperor of Rome for several months in 253 AD, known in English as Aemilian.
 Aemilian of Cogolla (472–573), Spanish saint
 Gerolamo Emiliani (1486–1537), also known as Jerome Aemilian, Italian humanitarian and Roman Catholic saint

Masculine given names